Commonwealth Prime Ministers' Conferences were biennial meetings of Prime Ministers of the United Kingdom and the Dominion members of the British Commonwealth of Nations. Seventeen Commonwealth Prime Ministers' Conferences were held between 1944 and 1969. As well, the prime ministers met for a Commonwealth Economic Conference in 1952. These series of conferences were a continuation and regularisation of the earlier Imperial Conferences which had been held periodically from 1887 to 1937. Since 1971, Commonwealth Heads of Government Meetings have been held.

Of the seventeen meetings, sixteen were held in London, reflecting then-prevailing views of the Commonwealth as the continuation of the British Empire and the centralisation of power in the British Commonwealth Office (the one meeting outside London, in Lagos, was an extraordinary meeting held in January 1966 to coordinate policies towards Rhodesia). Two supplementary meetings were also held during this period: a Commonwealth Statesmen's meeting to discuss peace terms in April 1945,  and a Commonwealth Economic Conference in 1952.

The first British Commonwealth Prime Ministers' Conference was held 1–16 May 1944 in order to coordinate the war effort. In attendance were: 

The British Commonwealth leaders agreed to support the Moscow Declaration and reached agreement regarding their respective roles in the overall Allied war effort.

Conferences consisted of the prime ministers or presidents of independent states as well as the premiers of some senior colonies. This policy changed with the 1964 Prime Ministers' Conference which was confined to independent states and thus excluded Southern Rhodesia whose prime ministers had attended Imperial and Commonwealth conferences since the 1930s. While the growing number of Commonwealth states was given as the reason for this change, it coincided with the emergence of white minority rule in Rhodesia as a major issue. 

The 1960s saw an overhaul of the Commonwealth. The swift expansion of the Commonwealth after decolonisation saw the newly independent countries demand the creation of the Commonwealth Secretariat, and the United Kingdom, in response, successfully founding the Commonwealth Foundation. This decentralisation of power demanded a reformulation of the meetings. Instead of the meetings always being held in London, they would rotate across the membership, subject to countries' ability to host the meetings: beginning with Singapore in 1971. They were also renamed the Commonwealth Heads of Government Meetings to reflect the growing diversity of the constitutional structures in the Commonwealth.

List of meetings

See also
Imperial Conference
Imperial War Cabinet
List of World War II conferences